"SuperLove" is a song by English singer Charli XCX, released as a single on 2 December 2013. Although the song was originally announced as the lead single from Charli's then-untitled second major-label studio album, it ultimately was not included on 2014's Sucker. The single reached number 62 on the UK Singles Chart, becoming Charli's first solo entry on the chart.

Background
According to Charli, "SuperLove" is a song about "running away and falling in love with someone and it being really dangerous and bad for you but still amazing, romantic and wonderful [...] 'SuperLove' is the best drug and this song is about overdosing on it and falling in real deep."

After being announced by XCX that the song would not appear on her sophomore studio album Sucker, a track listing was released online by Warner Music Group of the Japanese edition of the album, which featured "SuperLove" along with two other bonus tracks. This track listing was later changed, removing "SuperLove" and including the European bonus track "Red Balloon".

Critical reception
Robert Copsey of Digital Spy gave "SuperLove" four out of five stars, stating that the track "more than lives up to its ambitious billing. 'You're whisky, wasted and beautiful dancing through the fire/ You're such a vision to see,' she sings over a jaunty guitar line, swirling electronics and addictive cheerleader claps before unleashing a tongue-twister of a chorus that immediately knocks you over the head and commands you to dance along and given Charli's current ambitious mindset, who are we to argue with her?". Following of the release of her 2022 album Crash, Consequence ranked the song as Charli's eighth best song.

Music video
The accompanying music video for "SuperLove", directed by Ryan Andrews, was filmed in Tokyo and premiered on 26 September 2013. The video shows Charli performing the song in a room covered in multi-coloured lights and dancing with robots.

Track listings
Digital download
"SuperLove" – 3:13

Digital download – Remixes
"SuperLove" (Yeasayer Remix) – 3:53
"SuperLove" (Canblaster Remix) – 3:15
"SuperLove" (Mike Mago Remix) – 3:05

Charts

Release history

References

2013 singles
2013 songs
Asylum Records singles
Charli XCX songs
Songs written by Charli XCX
Songs written by Patrik Berger (record producer)